Gruissan is a commune in the Aude department in southern France. The historian Émile Raunié (1854–1911) was born in Gruissan.

Population

The Town 
Situated on the Mediterranean coast of Southern France, Gruissan is situated in the Parc naturel régional de la Narbonnaise en Méditerranée. Traditionally a fishing village, the circular town is built around the former castle; a 10th-century château of which only the Tour Barberousse (Redbeard Tower) remains.

See also
 Corbières AOC
 Communes of the Aude department

References

Communes of Aude
Aude communes articles needing translation from French Wikipedia